PT Industri Jamu dan Farmasi Sido Muncul Tbk, commonly known as Sido Muncul, is an Indonesian herbal medicine and food products company based in Semarang, Indonesia, established in 1940. It produces and markets a variety of consumer products related to herbal medication, such as the jamu Tolak Angin.

History
The company was founded in 1940 as a home business in Surakarta. Its founder, Rakhmat Sulistio, had formulated a recipe for a jamu, which she called "Tujuh Angin" (Seven Winds), later known as Tolak Angin. Due to the Indonesian National Revolution, she moved to Semarang, where in 1951 she established production for the jamu in a house and later in a factory by 1953. It was in 1951 when the name "Sido Muncul" was adopted, and the product changed from liquid to powdered jamu. The firm was registered as a CV in 1970, and as a limited liability company (PT) in 1975.

In 1992, its primary product Tolak Angin began to be sold in sachets as a liquid, its current form. Sido Muncul launched a secondary line of energy drink products under the  brand in 2004, at a time when the company was undergoing financial difficulties. Other lines of products outside of Tolak Angin were later launched, including candies, health drinks, and instant coffee. The company went public through an initial public offering at the Indonesian Stock Exchange on 18 December 2013, becoming the first herbal medicine company to list there. Six months after the IPO, the original founder's family held 81 percent of the company's shares.

Sido Muncul acquired Yogyakarta-based PT Berlico Mulia Farma, a pharmaceutical company which manufactured cough syrup, indigestion pills, and vitamins, in mid-2014, for Rp 125 billion. Sido Muncul's brands were then given to Berlico's products.

References

External links
 

1940 establishments in the Dutch East Indies
2013 initial public offerings
Companies based in Semarang
Health care companies established in 1940
Health care companies of Indonesia
Pharmaceutical companies established in 1940
Pharmaceutical companies of Indonesia
Companies listed on the Indonesia Stock Exchange